There have been four different professional baseball clubs in Venezuela that have played under the name Pastora. These teams have been established in the northwest of the country, particularly in the states of Zulia and Acarigua, and have played in different leagues between 1931 and 2000.

Team history
The Pastora team was based in the City of Maracaibo and was sponsored by a local dairy company, while adopting the name Lácteos de Pastora (Pastora Milkers). Although Zulia is a petroleum state, dairy farming is also a major industry there.

After Maracaibo was founded in 1529, shepherds tended cows and goats for their milk and to make cheese and other dairy products. On one hand, Pastora is the Spanish word for shepherd; on the other hand, the patron saint of the neighbor state of Lara is La Divina Pastora (The Divine Shepherdess).

Each January 14, her statue is typically carried on the main streets of Barquisimeto from the city of Santa Rosa, in the outskirts of Barquisimeto, until it reaches the Cathedral of Our Lady of Mount Carmel, Barquisimeto which is about five miles away. The devotion to the Divina Pastora in Venezuela dates from 1736, when the parish priest of the town of Santa Rosa commissioned a sculptor to make a statue of the Immaculate Conception. Unexpectedly, the figure that was delivered was of the Divina Pastora.

First stage
Pastora debuted in the extinct Zulian Baseball League First Division, which was created in 1932 and folded at the end of the 1940 season. After five years of absence, the league resumed operations in 1946 and remained active until 1952.

Pastora played in all these seasons, while winning the 1934 and 1948 titles. The most successful team in this period was the Gavilanes BBC, which won 13 of the 17 tournaments played, eight with Ernesto Aparicio at the helm. In 1951, Orange Victoria won the league championship remaining.

A storied baseball rivalry between Gavilanes and Pastora captured the fans' attention with fiery displays in every season.

Second stage
After that, the circuit was renamed Liga Occidental de Béisbol Profesional before joining Organized Baseball in 1953, operating continuously until 1964.

In 1953, the Venezuelan Professional Baseball League and the recently created LOBP agreed to have the clubs with the best records from each circuit meet in a National Championship Series called El Rotatorio, the first and only in VPBL history. The Cervecería Caracas and Navegantes del Magallanes clubs represented the VPBL, while Gavilanes and Pastora represented the LOBP. The pennant was clinched by Pastora with a 48–30 record. Managed by veteran Napoleón Reyes, the champion team won easily over Magallanes (40–37), Gavilanes (34–44) and Caracas (33–44), earning the right to represent Venezuela in the 1954 Caribbean Series.

In the opening game of the 1954 Series, the Venezuelan squad defeated the Cuban team for the first time in Series history, 7–5, after suffering 10 consecutive loses in the past five tournaments. Nevertheless, Pastora went 1–4 to finish last in the four-team event. Among others, that Pastora roster included pitchers Ralph Beard, Tommy Byrne, Howie Fox and Ramón Monzant; catcher Ed Bailey; outfielders Wally Moon and Billy Queen, as well as infielders Camaleón García, Vernon Benson, Johnny Temple and the then-rookie Luis Aparicio, who made his first Series appearance.

Pastora returned to the Zulia circuit for the 1954–55 season, to win the first title in this stage of the league. Both leagues used a new playoffs format in the 1957–58, 1958–59 and 1960–61 seasons to determine the national team to represent Venezuela in the Caribbean Series, but, after their championship season in 1954–55, the Pastora club was out of contention until 1963–64, during what turned out to be the LOBP's final season.

Third stage
More than four decades later, a new Pastora club joined the Venezuelan Professional Baseball League as a replacement for the Petroleros de Cabimas. Renamed as Pastora de Occidente, the team was based in the city of Cabimas. Managed by Domingo Carrasquel, they finished 18-34 in 1995-96 and 30-31 in 1996-97, without any chance of advancing to the playoffs in both seasons.

Players with MLB experience
 
Alex Cabrera
Dan Carlson
Doug Creek
Eddy Díaz
Gus Gandarillas
Alberto González
Ramón Hernández
Dax Jones
Rob Lukachyk
Robert Machado
Carlos Maldonado
Mike Misuraca
Carlos Monasterios
Luis Ordaz
Steve Pegues
Tomás Pérez
Roberto Petagine
Scott Pose
Sid Roberson
Olmedo Sáenz
Yorvit Torrealba
Joe Thurston
Carlos Valderrama
Keith Williams 
Desi Wilson
Trevor Wilson

Fourth stage

This time, Pastora moved to the cities of Acarigua and Araure in Portuguesa. The teams changed its name to the Pastora de los Llanos and continued to operate in the VPBL between the 1997–98 and 2006-2007 seasons.

Starting the 2007-08 season, the franchise moved to Margarita Island and was renamed Bravos de Margarita. Since then, no other team named Pastora has participated in Venezuelan professional baseball.

See also
Lácteos de Pastora players
Pastora de los Llanos players
Pastora de Occidente players

Sources
 Gutiérrez, Daniel; González, Javier (1992). Numeritos del béisbol profesional venezolano (1946-1992). LVBP, Caracas.

External links
es.Wikipedia.org – Historia del béisbol en Venezuela
es.Wikipedia.org – Liga Venezolana de Béisbol Profesional
VI Serie del Caribe – 1954

1932 establishments in Venezuela
Defunct baseball teams in Venezuela
Liga Occidental de Béisbol Profesional
Sport in Maracaibo
Sport in Portuguesa (state)
Baseball teams established in 1932